Marta Repullo i Grau (born 1976) is an Andorran writer, working in the Catalan language.

Born in Barcelona, Repullo soon moved to La Seu d'Urgell. She received her degree from the Autonomous University of Barcelona. 

A journalist by profession, during her career, she has worked with various media organizations throughout the Pyrenees; among these are Ràdio Seu, Ona Andorra, and El Periòdic d'Andorra. She has also developed her career in the arena of international cultural management and cooperation. Her writing career began early; at the age of fourteen she won second prize for her writing in a contest sponsored by the Generalitat de Catalunya. In 2001, she released Carícies de la lletra, a volume of poetry. Her work in shorter forms has won a number of prizes.

Awards
Among her awards are the Premi de narrativa curta del Consell Comarcal de l'Alt Urgell, which she received in 2000, and the Premi Recull del Concurs de Poesia de la Biblioteca Pública del Govern d'Andorra, which she won in 2001.

References

1976 births
Living people
Andorran women writers
Andorran poets
Andorran women poets
21st-century poets
21st-century women writers
Writers from Barcelona
People from La Seu d'Urgell
Autonomous University of Barcelona alumni
Andorran journalists
Andorran women journalists
21st-century journalists
Catalan-language writers